Karvaneh (also Romanized as Kārvāneh and Karwāna) is a village in Shirvan Rural District, in the Central District of Borujerd County, Lorestan Province, Iran. At the 2006 census, its population was 419, in 94 families.

References 

Towns and villages in Borujerd County